The Hon.  Justice George Wright (1917–1975) was a judge of the Supreme Court of Western Australia.

Biography
Wright was born in Adelaide, South Australia, where his father, The Reverend Dr George H Wright, was the minister at the Stow Memorial Congregational Church. His early education was at Kings College, Adelaide, before his father became Warden of Camden College in Sydney and he attended Newington College (1934–1935). The University of Sydney awarded him an Exhibition and so he went up to the University in 1936 and studied arts, graduating BA in 1939. In 1943 his father officiated at Wright’s marriage to Norma Higham at Trinity Congregational Church in Perth. After studying law at The University of Western Australia he was admitted as a legal practitioner in 1948. Wright became a partner of the law firm Jackson McDonald and from 1956 until 1958 was President of the Law Society of Western Australia. He was appointed to the Supreme Court in 1975 and died that year.

References

1917 births
1975 deaths
Judges of the Supreme Court of Western Australia
People educated at Newington College
University of Sydney alumni
University of Western Australia alumni